The 2011 Belgian Cup Final, named Cofidis Cup after the sponsor, was played on 21 May 2011 between Westerlo and Standard Liège. It was the 56th Belgian Cup final and was won by Standard Liège.

Road to the Final

 Both clubs received a bye to round six.
 In square brackets is a letter that represents the opposition's division
 [D1] = Belgian First Division
 [D2] = Belgian Second Division

Match details

Match Rules
90 minutes.
30 minutes of extra-time if necessary.
Penalty shoot-out if scores still level.
Maximum 7 named substitutes
Maximum of 3 substitutions.

See also
2010–11 Belgian Cup

References

Standard Liège matches
Cup
2011
May 2011 sports events in Europe
2011 in Brussels
Sports competitions in Brussels